George Padley (1882 – 2 November 1965) was an English professional footballer who played as a forward.

References

1882 births
1965 deaths
Footballers from Grimsby
English footballers
Association football forwards
Albert Swifts F.C. players
Grimsby St John's F.C. players
Grimsby Town F.C. players
Worksop Town F.C. players
Denaby United F.C. players
Cleethorpes Town F.C. players
Goole Town F.C. players
Grimsby Rovers F.C. players
Steam Trawler Co F.C. players
Charlton's F.C. players
English Football League players